Vanroonia is a genus of beetles in the family Buprestidae, containing the following species:

 Vanroonia afghanica Alexeev & Volkovitsh in Alexeev, et al., 1992
 Vanroonia africana (Obenberger, 1928)
 Vanroonia bispinosa (Wiedemann, 1823)
 Vanroonia cochinchinae (Descarpentries & Villiers, 1967)
 Vanroonia coomani (Descarpentries & Villiers, 1967)
 Vanroonia coraeboides Obenberger, 1923
 Vanroonia guineae Obenberger, 1958
 Vanroonia himalayana Obenberger, 1958
 Vanroonia indica (Obenberger, 1922) 
 Vanroonia javana (Kerremans, 1898)
 Vanroonia luzonica Bellamy, 1991
 Vanroonia marmorea (Deyrolle, 1864)
 Vanroonia moultoni (Kerremans, 1912)
 Vanroonia papuana (Obenberger, 1922)
 Vanroonia perroti (Descarpentries & Villiers, 1967)
 Vanroonia pyropyga (Kerremans, 1903)
 Vanroonia sachtlebeni Obenberger, 1958
 Vanroonia spinipennis (Kerremans, 1900)
 Vanroonia strandi Obenberger, 1931 
 Vanroonia vatineae (Baudon, 1965)

References

Buprestidae genera